Atlantis Word Processor is a stand-alone word processor for Microsoft Windows. It used to be known as "Atlantis Ocean Mind".

Features
Atlantis offers many features standard in other word processors. But it lacks some important features like collaboration. The present version of Atlantis Word Processor is not suitable for creating complex scientific documents with mathematical formulae and embedded objects.

On the other hand, Atlantis Word Processor has a number of features popular among writers. The Overused Words feature helps writers avoid repetitions and clichés. The "Save as eBook" feature converts any document to an eBook. Atlantis also provides writers with information about writing time and speed. Finally, Atlantis can be used to print booklets (including pocket-size booklets).

Atlantis Word Processor is portable and can be installed on USB flash drives.

Supported file formats
For both reading and writing:
 MS Word 6.0-2003 (.DOC)
 Office Open XML (.DOCX)
 Rich Text Format (.RTF)
 Plain text (.TXT)

For reading:
 MS Write (.WRI)
 OpenDocument (.ODT)

For writing:
 HTML
 EPUB

Atlantis Word Processor also has its proprietary document format (COD) for encrypted documents.

Product status
Atlantis Word Processor is distributed as shareware.

There is also a free version of Atlantis Word Processor with fewer features called Atlantis Word Processor Lite. It does not have some features the full version of Atlantis has; for example, the program does not include a built-in spellchecker.

Beginning with Atlantis Word Processor version 1.6.5.8, support for Windows 9x (95, 98, ME) and Windows NT4 was dropped.

See also
List of word processors
Comparison of word processors
List of portable software
Office Open XML software
OpenDocument software
EPUB

References

External links
Atlantis Word Processor home site

 

Shareware
Windows-only shareware
Windows word processors